The Don Glaciation, also known as the Donian Glaciation and the Donian Stage, was the major glaciation of the East European Plain, 0.5–0.8 million years ago, during the Cromerian Stage of the Middle Pleistocene. It is correlated to Marine Isotope Stage 16 (MIS 16), approximately 650,000 years ago, which globally contained one of the largest glacial volumes of the Quaternary.

Don Glaciation 
The Don Glaciation shows evidence of the most extensive ice sheet on the East European Plain, extending into the drainage basin of the middle and lower Don River in Russia, reaching 50 degrees north latitude. This glaciation occurred before the Muchkap interglacial and the Oka and Dnieper glaciations of Eastern Europe.

Marine Isotope Stage 16 
MIS 16 is a major glacial stage identified through measurements of oxygene isotopes in deep sea core samples (marine isotope stage) of Cromerian age, approximately 676-621 ka ago. In terms of global ice volume, it ranks as one of the two most extreme glaciations of the Quaternary, on par with MIS 12. However, in terms of sea water temperatures it is a much more modest glaciation, of similar climate intensity to the neighbouring Cromerian glaciations MIS 14 and MIS 18.

Correlations 
Don and MIS 16 are usually correlated to each other. This is based on assumption that the most widespread evidence for glaciation in the Cromerian ought to be associated with the largest glaciation on the global scene. However, the time resolution of current age determinations is insufficient for a clear distinction between MIS 14, MIS 16 and MIS 18.
It is unclear why the major glaciation of MIS 16 has left very little evidence in the geological records of Western Europe.
MIS 16 is believed to correspond to Pre-Illinoian D in North America.

See also 
 Timeline of glaciation

References 

Quaternary geochronology
Ice ages
Pleistocene
Glaciology
Paleoclimatology
Geology of Europe